Alina Cała (born 19 May 1953 in Warsaw) is a Polish writer, historian and sociologist. A former board member of the Jewish Historical Institute, she specialises in 19th and 20th century Polish-Jewish history, antisemitism and Jewish assimilation in Central and Eastern Europe.

Life
After 1976 Alina Cała collaborated with the Workers' Defence Committee and Committee for Social Self-defence KOR. In the 1980s she also co-founded the folk high school in Zbrosza Duża, perhaps the first institution for adult education to be independent from the Communist authorities since the end of World War II. After 1989 she has been a feminist and pro-choice activist. She collaborates with the Greens 2004 party.

As a historian, Alina Cała focuses mostly on Polish-Jewish relations in the last two centuries. Among her most important works is the Assimilation of Jews in the Kingdom of Poland (1864-1897) (published in 1989). Her most cited work is The Image of the Jew in Polish Folk Culture (1st edition 1987), also published since in English. In recent years she published a variety of historical books on modern Polish-Jewish history, notably the ideological views of the last generation of Jewish-Polish youth before the war, and the Polish-Jewish history between 1944 and 1968.

In a 2009 interview with the Polish newspaper Rzeczpospolita, Cała said that Poles shared responsibility for the deaths of the 3 million Jews murdered in Poland during the Nazi Holocaust. In a 2016 interview with Wprost, Cała said Poles bore responsibility for the fate of Jews who escaped into the forests, some of whom were hunted by Poles, according to publications by Jan Grabowski. Her views have been criticized by historians Andrzej Paczkowski, Piotr Gontarczyk, and Jerzy Woźniak.

References

External links

1953 births
Living people
Members of the Committee for Social Self-Defense KOR
Members of the Workers' Defence Committee
Writers from Warsaw
Polish feminists
20th-century Polish historians
The Greens (Poland) politicians
Politicians from Warsaw
21st-century Polish historians